KGM may refer to:

 General Directorate of Highways (Turkey)
 Kathgodam railway station, Indian Railway station code
 Kingham railway station has National Rail code KGM
 Manas Air had ICAO code KGM
 Palikúr language, also known as Karipuna of Amapá, an Arawakan language of Brazil and French Guiana, with ISO 639 code kgm
 kg·m, sometimes run together as kgm, an obsolete unit symbol for the kilopondmetre (sometimes erroneously called kilogramme-force metre, therefore kgm), a unit of torque